DLG may refer to:

 Dansk Landbrugs Grovvareselskab, a Danish feed company
 Dark Latin Groove, a band created in New York in the late 1990s
 David Lloyd George, a British politician who was prime minister in World War I
 Deutsche Landwirtschafts-Gesellschaft, the German Agricultural Society
 De la Gardiegymnasiet, Upper secondary school in Lidköping, Sweden
 Digital Line Graph, a cartographic file format used by the United States Geological Survey
 Dillingham Airport - DLG is the 3 letter IATA code for the airport
 Discus Launch Glider, a type and discipline of radio controlled glider
 DLG was the US Navy Hull Classification symbol for Guided Missile Destroyer Leaders
 Direct Line Group, a British insurance company